Nechasalyan is a rural municipality, or gaunpalika, located in Solukhumbu District, Province No. 1, Nepal.  Solukhumbu has eight municipalities in all; one is an urban municipality (or nagarpalika) and the other seven are rural municipalities.

Nechasalyan was created by the merger of three previously separate village development committees (or VDCs): Salyan, Necha Betghari, and Necha Batase. This merger was a result of the new Constitution of Nepal 2015.  The Ministry of Federal Affairs and Local Development replaced all the old VDCs and municipalities, replacing them with 753 new local-level bodies (Municipality).

This rural municipality is subdivided into five wards, with its headquarters in Ward No. 3 in Necha Betghari.

References

External links
 Official website
 Final District 1-75 Corrected Last for RAJPATRA

Rural municipalities in Koshi Province
Populated places in Solukhumbu District
Rural municipalities of Nepal established in 2017
Rural municipalities in Solukhumbu District